Tingena ombrodella is a species of moth in the family Oecophoridae. It is endemic to New Zealand and has been observed in the North and South Islands. Adults of this species are on the wing from November to January and the larvae of the species are litter feeders. This species has been found to inhabit native beech forest.

Taxonomy 

This species was first described and illustrated by George Hudson in 1950 as a variety of Borkhausenia innotella. In 1926 Alfred Philpott discussed and illustrated the genitalia of the male of this species under the nameBorkhausenia innotella. In 1928 George Hudson discussed and illustrated this species also under this name in his book The butterflies and moths of New Zealand.   In 1988 J. S. Dugdale placed this species within the genus Tingena. The male lectotype, collected at Whakapapa, Mount Ruapehu, is held at Te Papa.

Description

Hudson described this species as follows:

The larvae of this species was illustrated in a 1996 publication by J. S. Dugdale.

Distribution
This species is endemic to New Zealand and has been observed in the North Island including the species type locality of Whakapapa at Mount Ruapehu, in Redvale, Albany, in the Ōrongorongo Valley in Wellington, and at Coronet Peak.

Behaviour
This species is on the wing in November to January and the larvae are litter feeders.

Habitat 
This species has been found to inhabit native beech forests.

References

Oecophoridae
Moths of New Zealand
Moths described in 1950
Endemic fauna of New Zealand
Taxa named by Edward Meyrick
Endemic moths of New Zealand